Boys and Men, stylized as BOYS AND MEN, and colloquially referred to as BOYMEN or BM, is a Japanese idol group established in 2010 in Nagoya. The group is composed mainly of members from the Tōkai region. They belong to Fortune Entertainment. The group started up by performing musical with singing, acting and dancing, then started to show up on TV show, radio and different kind of music festival. The group's base activity location is Nagoya.

Their single  was number-one on the Oricon Weekly Singles Chart and also number-one on the Billboard Japan Hot 100. Their single  was also number-one on both charts.

Members

Former members

Discography

Singles
 Bari Bari ☆ Yankee Road (バリバリ☆ヤンキーロード)（2012年2月14日）
 Kawaranai Story / READYxREADY! (変わらないStory/READY×READY!)（2012年7月27日）
 Granspear no theme (グランスピアーのテーマ)（2013年12月18日）
 Shiawase no Tane / My Only Christmas Wish (幸せの種/My Only Christmas Wish)（2013年12月23日）
 RETURNER（2014年1月11日）
 Chocolate Prince (チョコレートプリンス)（2014年2月1日）
 Shautteiina / Lovely Monster (シャウッティーナ/Lovely Monster)（2014年5月10日）
 Tokonatsu Alright!!! (常夏オーライ!!!)（2014年7月25日）
 Good Job! Muchuuman / Mikansei Puzzle. (グッジョブ! ムチューマン/未完成パズル。)（2014年11月12日）
 BOIMEN Taisou (ボイメン体操)（2015年3月1日）
 Rei / Fanfare (零/Fanfare)（2015年4月4日）
 ARC of Smile!（2015年5月27日、マーベラス）
 stand hard! 〜Orera no Akogare Ryuu Senshi〜 (stand hard! 〜オレらの憧れ竜戦士〜)（2015年7月4日）
 Onegaiyo! Oh Summer (お願いよ!Oh Summer!)（2015年7月31日）
 BOYMEN NINJA（2016年1月6日）
 Wanna be!（2016年2月3日、キングレコード）
 YAMATO☆Dancing（2016年8月24日、Virgin Music）
 DoraMAX!!! 〜Orera no Akogare Ryuu Senshi〜ドラMAX!!! 〜オレらの憧れ竜戦士〜（2017年4月15日）
 Howoagero (帆を上げろ!)（2017年8月2日、Virgin Music）
 UFO（2017年11月3日、Virgin Music）
 Shinkarion (進化理論)（2018年5月9日）
 En・Tenka Dasshu (炎・天下奪取) (2018年9月12日発売予定)
 Film in my head (頭の中のフィルム) (5/29/2019)
 Fortissimo #ff (Mokoto) (フォルティシモ＃ｆｆ) (6/13/2019)
 Gattan Gotton GO! (ガッタンゴットンGO！) (12/25/2019)
 Oh Yeah! (9/09/2020)
 New Challenger (7/28/2021)

Albums
 Yankee ★ Road (ヤンキー★ロード)（2013年5月4日）
 YANKEE ROAD the BEST（2014年12月23日）
 Chicken (チキン)（Dai Nana Gakuen Choir (第七学園合唱部)、2016年5月19日、AR Records）
 Cheer up!（2016年6月1日、キングレコード）
 Ifudoudou〜B.M.C.A.〜 (威風堂々〜B.M.C.A.〜)（2016年12月14日、Virgin Music）
 TOKIO 47（配信アルバム、2017年3月28日、Virgin Music）
 Tomoarite (友ありて・・)（2017年12月20日、Virgin Music）
 BOYMEN the Universe (2021-01-27)

Notes

References

Works cited

External links
 

Japanese musical groups
2010 establishments in Japan
Musical groups established in 2010